Phelsuma punctulata, the  striped day gecko, is a species of gecko, a lizard in the family Gekkonidae. The species is endemic to Madagascar.

References

Phelsuma
Geckos of Africa
Reptiles of Madagascar
Endemic fauna of Madagascar
Reptiles described in 1970
Taxa named by Robert Mertens